Skillet is the debut studio album by American Christian rock band Skillet. Released in 1996 as an enhanced CD and audio cassette from ForeFront Records and Ardent Records, it showcases Christian lyrics with a grunge sound. Skillet was, at the time, a three-piece band composed of John Cooper on vocals, bass and piano, Trey McClurkin on drums and back-up vocals and Ken Steorts on guitar, back-up vocals and the guitar synth.

Track listing

Credits 
Skillet
 John L. Cooper – vocals, acoustic piano, bass guitar
 Ken Steorts – guitars, guitar synthesizer, backing vocals 
 Trey McClurkin – drums, backing vocals

Production
 Dana Key – executive producer 
 Patrick Scholes – executive producer 
 Paul Ebersold – producer, recording, mixing (1, 3, 4, 7)
 Skidd Mills – producer, recording, mixing (2, 5, 6, 8, 9, 10)
 Ken Steorts – additional engineer 
 Larry Nix – mastering at Ardent Mastering (Memphis, Tennessee)
 Troy Glasgow – photography 
 Jeff Kratschmer – design

Music videos
 "I Can"
 "Gasoline"
 "Saturn"
Also, a new video was made for the song "Splinter".

Skillet's self-titled album was the only album with more than one music video until Comatose, which had four. Ardent Worship  had none.

"I Can" is a simple video, and shows the band playing on a stage along with various shots of the crowd worshipping God. The video was shot during an actual live show, as it adds an extra portion of the band playing and a part at the end of the song where John Cooper shares his testimony with the crowd.

"Gasoline" also shows the band playing on a stage, though it is unknown if this was during an actual show or simply a video shoot. It also features scenes of John crawling around in an outdoor scene, meant to be crying out for God.

The "Saturn" video features the band wandering around a large telescope and laboratory, as well as playing on a rooftop.

References

External links
Music video for "Gasoline"

Skillet (band) albums
1996 debut albums
Ardent Records albums
ForeFront Records albums

Grunge albums